Laura Bow is a fictional amateur detective and heroine of two adventure games, The Colonel's Bequest (1989) and The Dagger of Amon Ra (1992), both created by the computer game company Sierra On-Line. She was created by Roberta Williams, co-founder of Sierra On-Line and creator of the classic King's Quest series. The Colonel's Bequest, after King's Quest IV: The Perils of Rosella, was also the second Sierra game to feature a female lead. Laura Bow is one of the earliest main female protagonists in a graphic adventure game overall.

Overview 
The first game takes place in a bayou in Louisiana in the 1920s. Bow is portrayed as a Southern belle in her early twenties who is headstrong, determined, somewhat naïve, and extremely clever. She is a student at Tulane University in The Colonel's Bequest before she becomes a journalist in New York City in The Dagger of Amon Ra. Attendance at Tulane is an anachronism, as the University did not admit women until later.  Women were admitted to Newcomb College, an affiliated institution.  Her father, John Bow, is a retired detective and taught her everything she knows about detective work.

Both games featuring Bow are murder mysteries, but only The Colonel's Bequest was actually created by Williams. Williams did work on several aspects of The Dagger of Amon Ra - characters, art, style, the look and feel of the overall game - and made sure Laura Bow felt like the same character from the previous game, but she took more of a backseat role, letting new designer Bruce Balfour take over.

In The Dagger of Amon Ra, Bow was voiced by Leslie Wilson (who later married designer Bruce Balfour), who also voiced the character of Yvette Delacroix and the narrator.

Aftermath 
The last allusion to her eventual fate is given as an Easter egg in the first Gabriel Knight, Sierra's later adventure made and set in 1993: an octogenarian Pulitzer Prize winner named Laura Bow-Dorian is scheduled to give a lecture on investigative reporting at Tulane University. Dorian was the surname of Laura's love interest, Steve Dorian, in The Dagger of Amon Ra.

Several fan games and petitions to relaunch the series and character have been either made, begun and abandoned, or discussed over the years. In 2019, a modern game called Laura Bow and the Mechanical Codex was in development from indie developer NineZyme Entertainment, planned to be the third instalment in the series, though the intellectual property rights had not yet been worked out with Activision. The current state of development is unknown.

PC Gamer released a retrospective article about the character in 2020, marking more than 30 years since her introduction, calling her a "trailblazing heroine".

Name
Bow's name is an allusion to 1920s actress Clara Bow. Bow's appearance (especially in The Dagger of Amon Ra) closely resembles Clara Bow's, particularly her curly red hair.

References

External links
Laura Bow 1: Cast of Characters | Sierra Planet
The Sierra Chest - Colonel's Bequest (the): A Laura Bow Mystery
The Sierra Chest - Dagger of Amon Ra: A Laura Bow Mystery (The)
Vintage-Sierra.com - Laura Bow Series (archive.org) - an archive with information on the Laura Bow games
Character Retrospective - PC Gamer

Adventure game characters
Fictional reporters
Female characters in video games
Characters in pulp fiction
Sierra Entertainment
Video game characters introduced in 1989
Video game protagonists